The following lists events that happened during 1947 in Chile.

Incumbents
President of Chile: Gabriel González Videla

Events

February
6 February - The Captain Arturo Prat Base is inaugurated, the oldest in the country in Antarctica.

April
9 April - Through decree 1831 of 1947 of the Ministry of Education, the Universidad Técnica del Estado is created.

June 
23 June - The President of the Republic Gabriel González Videla makes an official statement on maritime jurisdiction.

August
15 August – The Santiago Museum of Contemporary Art is inaugurated.

Births
2 June – Juan Gabriel Valdés
28 July – Coco Legrand
21 September – Hernán Larraín
30 November – Patricia Verdugo (d. 2008)
30 November – Sergio Badilla Castillo

Deaths

References 

 
Years of the 20th century in Chile
Chile